White English may refer to:

Dogs 
American Bulldog, breed of utility dog
White English Terrier, extinct breed of dog

Other uses 
White British, an ethnicity classification used in the 2011 United Kingdom Census